Luis Ángel González Torres (born 7 November 1999) is a Venezuelan footballer who plays as a goalkeeper for Venezuelan Segunda División side Deportivo Petare.

Career

Club career
González played his youth years at Caracas, before joining Atlético Venezuela later. He played his way up through to the first team in 2018, getting his debut in a 3-2 defeat on 27 January 2018 against Deportivo Lara at the age of 18. He made five appearances in the Venezuelan Primera División, before he was loaned out to Chicó de Guayana for six months to continue his development. He returned for the 2019 season but wasn't taken into count, before he left Atlético.

In January 2020, González moved to Venezuelan Segunda División side Deportivo Petare. As of July 2021, he was still playing for the club.

References

External links
 
 

Living people
1999 births
Association football goalkeepers
Venezuelan footballers
Venezuelan Primera División players
Atlético Venezuela C.F. players
Deportivo Miranda F.C. players
21st-century Venezuelan people